Paper Tag Nation is an investigative documentary by NBC Dallas that looks into how the Texas Department of Motor Vehicles fixed loopholes regard temporary license plates.

Background
In 2018, Texas State Troopers began to see an increase in paper license plates on vehicles on their roads.  When the COVID plague hit, DMV offices were closed.  Many people who have purchased an automobile needed a temporary registration to operate their vehicles on the road.  As time went on, criminals opened dealerships for the sole purpose of printing and issuing tags.

Timeline
May 2021: 3 people are federally indicted for fraud involving temporary tags.
July 2021: NBC NY's I-Team investigates the issue.
November 2021: NBC Dallas launches an investigation into the paper tag Black Market.
July 2022: The DMV requires applicates to provide fingerprints as part of identification.
December 2022: The DMV redesigns their tag to curb fraud.

References

External links
In depth coverage NBC Dallas

American documentary television films
Year of work missing